Sumontha's gecko (Cyrtodactylus sumonthai) is a species of lizard in the family Gekkonidae. The species is endemic to Thailand.

Etymology
The specific name, sumonthai, is in honor of Thai biologist Montri Sumontha.

Geographic range
C. sumonthai is found in Rayong Province in eastern Thailand.

Habitat
The preferred natural habitats of C. sumonthai are limestone caves and limestone outcrops.

Reproduction
C. sumonthai is oviparous.

References

Further reading
Bauer AM, Pauwels OSG, Chanhome L (2002). "A New Species of Cave-dwelling Cyrtodactylus (Squamata: Gekkonidae) from Thailand". Natural History Journal of Chulalongkorn University 2 (2): 19–29. (Cyrtodactylus sumonthai, new species).
Chan-ard T, Parr JWK, Nabhitabhata J (2015). A Field Guide to the Reptiles of Thailand. New York: Oxford University Press. 352 pp.  (hardcover),  (paperback).

Cyrtodactylus
Reptiles described in 2002